The Cardiastethini are a tribe of flower bugs, erected by Carayon in 1972 and based on the type genus Cardiastethus.

Genera
According to BioLib the following are included: 
 Alofa Herring, 1976
 Amphiareus Distant, 1904
 Brachysteles Mulsant & Rey, 1852
 Buchananiella Reuter, 1884
 Cardiastethus Fieber, 1860 (synonym Dasypterus Reuter, 1871)
 Dolostethus Henry & Herring, 1978
 Dysepicritus Reuter, 1884
 Indocoris Muraleedharan & Ananthakrishnan, 1978
 Orthosoleniopsis Poppius, 1909
 Pehuencoris Carpintero & Dellapé, 2006
 Physopleurella Reuter, 1884
 Rajburicoris Carpintero & Dellapé, 2008
 Xylocoridea Reuter, 1876
 Xyloecocoris Reuter, 1879
 †Brachypicritus Popov & Herczek, 2011

References

External links
 

Anthocoridae
Hemiptera tribes